Alex Mascioli is an American businessman and investor.  He is the founder and managing partner of North Street Capital, LP which invests in leveraged buyouts and public and private equity.

Business career
Mascioli has been involved in Dutch automaker Spyker Cars and Swedish automaker Saab automobile.  Mascioli and Saab Chairman & CEO Victor Muller came to a deal in which North Street would acquire the supercar maker Spyker from Swedish Automobile, which began to struggle financially with Saab, for $43.5 million in cash, and the proceeds would be used to pay off company debt. Shortly afterwards another deal was struck in which Alex Mascioli would pay $70 million to buy shares of Saab and issue a convertible note of $60 million collateralized by Saab's assets.  In 2011, the press reported that Mascioli might take over 100% of Saab and in an interview with Reuters it was mentioned that he had the capacity to take over the company should he chose to do so.

Media
Mascioli has been published in magazines featured as "On The Road With Alex Mascioli" for articles relating to automakers which include Audi, Bentley, BMW, Maserati, Mercedes, and Jaguar.

References

American financiers
American investors
American hedge fund managers
American stock traders
Businesspeople from Greenwich, Connecticut
Stock and commodity market managers
American financial analysts
1975 births
Living people